New Order is a 2020 thriller art film. It takes place in a dystopian near future Mexico. It was written, directed, produced and edited by Michel Franco and is a French-Mexican co-production.

The film had its world premiere on September 10, 2020 at the Venice Film Festival, where it won the Grand Jury Prize. Shots of darker-skinned underclass attacking a lighter-skinned elite provoked a furious backlash on Mexican social media when its trailer was released because of its perceived racial stereotyping. The criticism towards the film continued after its premiere in theaters and still remained after its release in streaming. The film stars Naian González Norvind, Diego Boneta and Mónica Del Carmen.

Synopsis
In 2020, the gap between social classes in Mexico is increasingly marked. A high-society wedding is interrupted by a group of armed and violent rioters who are part of an even larger uprising of the underprivileged, and take the participants as hostages. The Mexican Army exploits the disorder caused by the riots to establish a military dictatorship in the country. It involves the kidnappings of young adults, extortion, assaults, torture of the kidnapped while being held, and execution upon receiving no ransom, some of it, or all of it, by the Mexican military.

Cast
 Naian Gonzalez Norvind as Marianne
 Diego Boneta as Daniel 
 Mónica Del Carmen as Marta
 Fernando Cuautle as Cristian
 Darío Yazbek as Alan
 Eligio Meléndez as Rolando
 Roberto Medina as Iván
 Patricia Bernal as Pilar
 Lisa Owen as Rebeca
 Enrique Singer as Victor
 Gustavo Sánchez Parra as General Oribe

Production
Michel Franco started to develop the idea in 2014, and finished the script in 2017. Production concluded in May, 2019. The cast included Naian Gonzalez Norvind, Diego Boneta, Mónica Del Carmen, Fernando Cuautle, Darío Yazbek Bernal and Eligio Meléndez.

Release
The film had its world premiere on September 10, 2020 at the Venice Film Festival where it was awarded the Grand Jury Prize. It also screened at the Toronto International Film Festival on September 15, 2020. Shortly after, Neon and Mubi acquired distribution rights to the film in the U.S., the U.K., India, Ireland, Latin America and Turkey, respectively. The film was released in Mexico on October 22, 2020, by Videocine. It was released in a limited release in the United States on May 21, 2021.

Reception

Critical reception
The website's critics consensus reads: "In spite of solid performances, New Order's merciless brutality and unfocused gaze threaten to derail its message." On Metacritic, the film holds a rating of 62 out of 100, based on 22 critics.

Peter Debruge of Variety said: "Essentially picking up where The Joker left off, this ultra-provocative case of speculative fiction promises a view of what change might look like, only to succumb to a deep sense of cynicism as the scope of the film becomes unmanageable."

IndieWire gave it a C+, as critic Nicholas Barber wrote: "It's a bold, angry, provocative indictment, but because Franco zooms back to the state-of-the-nation big picture, he loses sight of the characters who were sketched so sharply in the opening scenes. They’re still in the film, but they have so little agency and dialogue that they are reduced to counters on a board".

In Spain, newspaper El País wrote: "The film does not come close to the fine class analysis that Bong Joon-ho's Parasite made, because it fails to increasingly develop the unbearable tension between rich and poor... His chaos scenes are closer to those seen in Todd Phillips' Joker, but without an actor like Joaquin Phoenix to understand the depth of the madness". The sociologist David Leupold also sees a strong parallel between the two films, albeit, arrives at a more positive evaluation: "New Order begins where Parasite ends ... In the case of Parasite we see the story unfolding from the perspective of the dispossessed family whereas in New Order it is through the perspective of an elite family subjected to violence by the dispossessed. What both films also have in common is the lack of clear moralizing attributes. Neither the elites appear as particularly vicious nor the disempowered as heroic ... It is clear that instead of self-righteous blaming, polemical simplifications and paternalizing moralizations, the directors are concerned with something else and much more decisive: exposing the acute structures of injustice and the imminent danger they harbour."

Backlash in Mexico
Prior to its release in Mexican cinemas, the film's trailer was received with an overwhelming negative response from the public and internet backlash as the scenes of the trailer was called by Mexican audiences on social media "Classist, racist and painfully stereotypical portraits of upper and lower classes in Mexico".

The racism accusations towards the film in Mexico worsened as director Michel Franco claimed the film was a target of "profound reverse racism" and felt himself as a victim of "hate crimes" as a White Mexican. Franco would later post an apology on social media for his statements, claiming he was not aware of the impact of the terms he used towards the public's reception of the film trailer.

José Antonio Aguilar, executive director of RacismoMX, a nationwide initiative in Mexico to address issues of racism in the country said: “The film's trailer repeats many racial stereotypes: brown people are poor, they’re savages, they’re resentful and want revenge.”

After the release of the film, Erick Estrada from the website Cinegarage wrote: "[To] the ones who wish [to] revert [to] the establishment, [it is] a warning about the consequences of their acts than calling attention to how it was before the country's militarization." In Codigo Espaguetti, Nicolas Ruiz said the film is "[a criticism], with no empathy, from this cold distance that sees individuals as sheep and protesters as blood-thirsty zombies; it creates banal, shallow and Manichean representations".

Arturo Magaña Arce in Cine Premiere reiterated the same view when he said the film "gives reason to those who judge people who, in a desperate way, [seek to] reclaim justice from the streets".

See also
 Elite panic

References

External links
 
 

2020 films
Mexican drama films
French drama films
Films directed by Michel Franco
Films set in Mexico City
2020s dystopian films
Films about coups d'état
Films about social class
Mexican independent films
French independent films
Venice Grand Jury Prize winners
Neon (distributor) films
Film controversies in Mexico
2020s Spanish-language films
2020s French films
2020s Mexican films